Frankenstein is a municipality in the district of Kaiserslautern, in Rhineland-Palatinate, western Germany. On a hill towering over the village is Frankenstein Castle. Frankenstein (Pfalz) station is located on the Mannheim–Saarbrücken railway.

References

Municipalities in Rhineland-Palatinate
Palatinate Forest
Kaiserslautern (district)